A Synthetic Natural Environment (SNE) is the representation in a synthetic environment of the physical world within which all models of military systems exist and interact (i.e. climate, weather, terrain, oceans, space, etc.).  It includes both data and models representing the elements of the environment, their effects on military systems, and models of the impact of military systems on environmental variables (e.g. contrails, dust clouds from moving vehicles, spoil from combat engineering).

History 
The term SNE was born out of Defense Advanced Research Projects Agency (DARPA)'s Synthetic Theater of War "Advanced Concept Technology Demonstration," ca. 1998.

Evolution 
Although SNE was meant to include cultural features (see Synthetic human-made environment) (e.g. buildings, bridges, roads) since its conception, the word "natural" in SNE made the term confusing.  Furthermore, the original term SNE was not meant to include cultural factors (see Synthetic psychological environment).

See also
 Modeling and simulation
 Glossary of military modeling and simulation

References

Further reading
 Braudaway, Wesley Ph.D., "Chapter 3 Synthetic Natural Environments Representation", University of Central Florida,  

 
Military terminology
Synthetic environment